Mir EO-24 was the 24th long-duration mission to Russia's Mir space station.

Crew
This mission was part of the Shuttle-Mir Program, in which three American astronauts flew aboard the station during Mir EO-24.

Note:   Léopold Eyharts joined the Soyuz TM-26 crew on the way home from Mir, after launching with Soyuz TM-27 crewmembers Talgat Musabayev and Nikolai Budarin at the end of Mir EO-24. Foale arrived aboard Mir during the EO-23 mission, and was transferred to the EO-24 crew when the expeditions changed. Thomas remained aboard Mir as part of the EO-25 crew after the end of EO-24.

See also

 1997 in spaceflight

External links
 Mir 24 Summary

Mir
1997 in spaceflight